Pesadilla en la cocina (English: Nightmare in the kitchen) is a Spanish food reality television program hosted by chef Alberto Chicote. It airs on laSexta, and is the Spanish adaptation of the Ramsay's Kitchen Nightmares franchise.

History
The original format started on British station Channel 4 in 2004 under the name Ramsay's Kitchen Nightmares. It was hosted by renowned chef Gordon Ramsay, who tried to save British catering establishments on the verge of bankruptcy. Its success led to Fox Broadcasting Company acquiring the rights to the format and launching the American version, also hosted by Ramsay, in 2007.

In 2010, Spanish TV station Nova, owned by Grupo Antena 3 (now Atresmedia), started airing both the British and American versions of the show, notching notable rating figures for the channel's standards. In 2012, right before its merging into Grupo Antena 3, laSexta acquired the rights to the format and started preparing the launch of the Spanish version of the show, which would be named Pesadilla en la cocina (the same title under which Nova still airs Ramsay's Kitchen Nightmares and Kitchen Nightmares to this day). Pesadilla en la cocina premiered on laSexta's prime time slot on October 25, 2012. The chef selected to host the format was Madrid-born Alberto Chicote, who was named restaurateur of the year in Spain in 2006 and was the owner of Pandelujo, named restaurant of the year in 2010.

Failures and controversies
El Castro de Lugo, in Madrid, closed shortly before the episode about it aired. Besides, the cook, who was portrayed on the show as an absent-minded and extremely devout woman, claimed everything was scripted and she had been forced to play that role. She also added that the part where she was shown praying in a nearby church was filmed without her consent.
Da Vinci (renamed Nuevo Da Vinci while filming), in Moraira (Alicante) closed two weeks later than El Castro. Its owner claimed that Chicote's advice had proven useless and criticized statements made by Chicote on El Hormiguero. Later the owner's son refuted him claiming that the changes Chicote suggested were good for business, but were not useful because of the lack of commitment of his father.
In June 2013, it was announced that Japanese restaurant To-Toro (formerly Osaka), located in Ronda (Málaga) was closing its doors.
La Ermita, in Madrid, closed during the summer of 2013 for undisclosed reasons.
Katay, in Tomares (Seville), was closed by its owners in October 2013. They thanked the crew of the show for their efforts.
In 2014, Sip Bar (renamed Flor de Tapa while filming), in Miami (Florida, United States), closed once Chicote helped them. The current status of the restaurant is unknown, since its Facebook page still features its old name and has no recent references. It has been reported to have closed forever.
L'Orbayu, in Las Vegas (Asturias) closed in June 2013, apparently due to its owner's health issues.
La Hamburguesía (renamed La Broqueta while filming), in Alcoy (Alicante) saw a rare case of double sell in which the original owners, with the restaurant recently renovated after shooting the show, sold it only for the new owner to sell it again shortly after. They were accused of illegally profiting from the show.
For the relaunch of restaurant Yatiri in Ibiza, the crew of the show organized a press conference with local media, something unheard of until then. However, the restaurant failed to stay afloat and was sold soon after.

Aside of the closures listed above, Pesadilla en la cocina has also seen some controversial incidents. The most notorious of them happened in Bilbao, when Chicote went to help La Reina del Arenal and its annex Opila. The owners asked the station not to air the episode about them claiming they had been coerced, and claimed it had been manipulated after its broadcast. Also, Chicote was accused of homophobic behaviour when he told one of the owners that he looked "like a little girl" and asked him if he would "put anything into his mouth".

Other person who raised his voice against Pesadilla en la cocina was Cristóbal, the owner of El Yugo de Castilla (Boecillo, Valladolid), personal friend of Alberto Chicote, who completely ignored his advice after filming. Later he would claim that his suggestions were not adequate and that the renovation made his restaurant look worse. El Yugo would remain closed to the public and serving only personal requests until 2016.

Episode list

Season 1

Season 2

Season 3

Season 4

Season 5

Season 6

Season 7

References

2012 Spanish television series debuts
Food reality television series
LaSexta original programming